Gross anatomy is the study of anatomy at the visible or macroscopic level. The counterpart to gross anatomy is the field of histology, which studies microscopic anatomy. Gross anatomy of the human body or other animals seeks to understand the relationship between components of an organism in order to gain a greater appreciation of the roles of those components and their relationships in maintaining the functions of life. The study of gross anatomy can be performed on deceased organisms using dissection or on living organisms using medical imaging. Education in the gross anatomy of humans is included training for most health professionals.

Techniques of study
Gross anatomy is studied using both invasive and noninvasive methods with the goal of obtaining information about the macroscopic structure and organization of organs and organ systems. Among the most common methods of study is dissection, in which the corpse of an animal or a human cadaver is surgically opened and its organs studied. Endoscopy, in which a video camera-equipped instrument is inserted through a small incision in the subject, may be used to explore the internal organs and other structures of living animals. The anatomy of the circulatory system in a living animal may be studied noninvasively via angiography, a technique in which blood vessels are visualized after being injected with an opaque dye. Other means of study include radiological techniques of imaging, such as X-ray and MRI.

In medical and healthcare professional education
Most health profession schools, such as medical, physician assistant, and dental schools, require that students complete a practical (dissection) course in gross human anatomy. Such courses aim to educate students in basic human anatomy and seek to establish anatomical landmarks that may later be used to aid medical diagnosis. Many schools provide students with cadavers for investigation by dissection, aided by dissection manuals, as well as cadaveric atlases (e.g. Netter's, Rohen's).

Working intimately with a cadaver during a gross anatomy course has been shown to capture the essence of the patient-provider relationship. However, the expense of maintaining cadaveric dissection facilities has limited the time and resources available for gross anatomy teaching in many medical schools, with some adopting alternative prosection-based or simulated teaching. This, coupled with decreasing time dedicated to gross anatomical courses within the growing greater medical school curriculum, has caused controversy surrounding the sufficiency of anatomical teaching with nearly half of newly qualified doctors believing they received insufficient anatomy teaching.

Medical schools have implemented on-screen anatomical lessons and tutorials to teach students surgical procedures. The use of technological visual aids and gross dissection are more effective together than either approach alone. Recently, online flashcards and quizzes have been used as well.

See also
Human anatomy
Histology
Anatomy

References

Anatomy